The Masked Singer is an American reality singing competition television series based on the South Korean television program King of Mask Singer. The show, which involves celebrities singing anonymously in elaborate full-body costumes, was developed by Craig Plestis and is hosted by Nick Cannon. During most episodes, four to six celebrities each perform covers of famous songs in costume in front of a studio audience and panelists Ken Jeong, Jenny McCarthy Wahlberg, Nicole Scherzinger, and Robin Thicke. After the audience and panelists vote for their favorite performance, the celebrity with the fewest votes is eliminated from the competition and takes off their mask, revealing their identity.

The series has been broadcast on Fox since January 2, 2019, and has aired eight seasons thus far. Plestis and Izzie Pick Ibarra have served as executive producers since the first season; Rosie Seitchik and Cannon have also done so since the second and third, respectively. As the highest-rated entertainment series in the adults 18–49 key demographic both television seasons it has aired, the program's ratings have remained consistently high. Owing to its success, an aftershow, The Masked Singer: After the Mask, was formed as a spin-off. The series's costume designer has won a Costume Designers Guild Award in the Excellence in Variety, Reality-Competition, Live Television category, and has received two Primetime Emmy Award for Outstanding Costumes for a Variety, Nonfiction, or Reality Programming nominations. Aside from double-length episodes, most run for about 43 minutes.

Series overview

Episodes

Season 1 (2019)

Season 2 (2019)

Season 3 (2020)

Season 4 (2020)

Season 5 (2021)

Season 6 (2021)

Season 7 (2022)

Season 8 (2022)

Season 9 (2023)

Specials

The Masked Singer: After the Mask

Viewership and ratings

Glossary

Notes

References

Sources

External links
 
 

Lists of American reality television series episodes
The Masked Singer (American TV series)